Liao Min-chun (born 27 January 1988) is a Taiwanese badminton player. In 2013, he won the men's doubles title at the Vietnam International tournament partnered with Yang Po-han. Teamed-up with Su Ching-heng in the men's doubles, he won the International Challenge title at the 2016 Welsh International, 2017 Orleans International, and 2017 Finnish Open tournament. He announced retirement on January 20, 2023.

Achievements

Summer Universiade 
Men's doubles

BWF World Tour (1 runner-up) 
The BWF World Tour, which was announced on 19 March 2017 and implemented in 2018, is a series of elite badminton tournaments, sanctioned by Badminton World Federation (BWF). The BWF World Tour is divided into six levels, namely World Tour Finals, Super 1000, Super 750, Super 500, Super 300 (part of the HSBC World Tour), and the BWF Tour Super 100.

Men's doubles

BWF Grand Prix (1 title, 4 runners-up) 
The BWF Grand Prix had two levels, the Grand Prix and Grand Prix Gold. It was a series of badminton tournaments sanctioned by the Badminton World Federation (BWF) and played between 2007 and 2017.

Men's doubles

Mixed doubles

  BWF Grand Prix Gold tournament
  BWF Grand Prix tournament

BWF International Challenge/Series (4 titles, 1 runner-up)
Men's doubles

  BWF International Challenge tournament
  BWF International Series tournament
  BWF Future Series tournament

References

External links 

 

Living people
1988 births
Sportspeople from Kaohsiung
Taiwanese male badminton players
Badminton players at the 2010 Asian Games
Badminton players at the 2014 Asian Games
Asian Games bronze medalists for Chinese Taipei
Medalists at the 2014 Asian Games
Asian Games medalists in badminton
Universiade medalists in badminton
Universiade bronze medalists for Chinese Taipei
Medalists at the 2011 Summer Universiade